Li Suwen (1933 – 4 April 2022) was a Chinese politician who served as the vice chairperson of the Standing Committee of the National People's Congress.

References 

1933 births
2022 deaths
20th-century Chinese women
21st-century Chinese women
Vice Chairpersons of the National People's Congress
Delegates to the 3rd National People's Congress
Delegates to the 4th National People's Congress
Members of the 9th Central Committee of the Chinese Communist Party
Members of the 10th Central Committee of the Chinese Communist Party
People from Shenyang